John Bright Banister (1880–1938) was senior obstetric physician at Charing Cross Hospital, London, and a member of staff at Queen Charlotte's and Chelsea Hospital for Women. During the First World War he served as chief medical officer at the Anglo-French Hospital, Le Treport and was a surgical specialist at No. 17 British General Hospital in Alexandria. He was a member of the council of the Royal College of Obstetricians and Gynaecologists.

References 

1880 births
1938 deaths
British obstetricians
Physicians of Charing Cross Hospital